Sphecodes geoffrellus  is a Palearctic species of sweat bee.

References

External links
Images representing  Sphecodes geoffrellus

Hymenoptera of Europe
Halictidae
Insects described in 1802